Qamar Ahmed (born 23 October 1937) is a Pakistani cricket journalist and former first-class cricketer who played for Sindh and Hyderabad cricket teams.

Playing career
Ahmed made his first-class debut for Sind against Karachi Whites in the Quaid-e-Azam Trophy in 1956-57, taking 3 for 60 in an innings defeat for Sind. He and the future Test player Mushtaq Mohammad, who was also making his first-class debut for Karachi Whites, dismissed each other. He played again for Sind in 1957-58, but the Sind team was discontinued in 1958, and he began playing for the new Hyderabad team in 1958-59. When Hyderabad won for the first time, against Khairpur in 1959-60, Ahmed took 6 for 36 with his left-arm spin in the second innings.

He captained Hyderabad in the Quaid-e-Azam Trophy in 1961-62, but they lost all three of their matches, failing to dismiss any of their opponents.

His highest score was 68 not out at number 10 for Hyderabad against Karachi A in 1962-63.

In Wounded Tiger, his history of Pakistan cricket, Peter Oborne says Ahmed has the unique distinction of having dismissed all five brothers of the famous Mohammad family in first-class cricket. In fact, although he did dismiss Hanif, Mushtaq and Sadiq, he did not dismiss Wazir or Raees – at least not in first-class cricket.

Journalism
He earned a master's degree in English Literature at the University of Sindh and began his journalism career at the Indus Times in Hyderabad. Since 1963 he has worked as a freelance journalist. At the Third Test between Pakistan and Sri Lanka in Sharjah in January 2014 he became the third journalist, after John Woodcock and Richie Benaud, to cover 400 Tests. At that stage he had also covered 732 One Day Internationals and eight World Cups. For most of his journalism career he has been based in the UK.

Books
Pakistan Book of Cricket (annual from 1976 to 1998-99) 
Testing Time (1983) 
Showdown: The Story of Pakistan's Tour of the West Indies 1993 (1993) 
Playing for Pakistan: An Autobiography by Hanif Mohammad with Qamar Ahmed (1999) 
An Artist's Impression of the Golden Greats of Pakistan Cricket (with Shafiq Ahmed) (2002)
For Cricket and Country by Waqar Hasan with Qamar Ahmed (2002)

References

External links
 Qamar Ahmed at CricketArchive
 Qamar Ahmed at Cricinfo

1937 births
Living people
Pakistani cricketers
University of Sindh alumni
Sindh cricketers
Hyderabad (Pakistan) cricketers
Pakistani sports journalists
Pakistani sports broadcasters
Cricket historians and writers
People from Karachi
Pakistani cricket commentators